Jayanagar  is a village development committee in Kapilvastu District in the Lumbini Zone of southern Nepal. At the time of the 1991 Nepal census it had a population of 5886. The government of Nepal has integrated Jayanagar, Mahendrakot and Dubiya village development committees into Buddhanhumi municipality.

Jayanagar means "Victory Town".

References

Populated places in Kapilvastu District